Emamzadeh Mir Salar Fartaq (also Romanized as Emāmzādeh Mīr Sālār Fārtaq; also known as Emāmzādeh Mīr Sālār) is a village in Bahmayi-ye Sarhadi-ye Sharqi Rural District, Dishmok District, Kohgiluyeh County, Kohgiluyeh and Boyer-Ahmad Province, Iran. At the 2006 census, its population was 310, in 57 families.

References 

Populated places in Kohgiluyeh County